Runaway is a 2000 EP album by author and punk rock musician Jim Carroll and his final solo studio work before his death in 2009.

Track listing
 "Runaway" (Del Shannon, Max Crook) - (4:24)
 "Hairshirt Fracture" (Carroll, Robert Roth) - (4:24)
 "I Want the Angel" (Carroll, Brian Linsley) - (2:51)
 "It's Too Late" (Carroll, Wayne Woods) - (2:58)
 "Falling Down Laughing" (Carroll, Robert Roth) - (3:51)

Track 2 is a 1994 demo from Pools of Mercury
Tracks 3-5 recorded live at the Crocodile Cafe, Seattle on 17 November 1998

Personnel
Jim Carroll - vocals
Gary Valentine - rhythm guitar on "Runaway"
Mark Pickerel - drums
Robert Roth - guitar, organ
Kurt Bloch - guitar
Brian Young - drums
George Reed-Harmon - bass
Hiro Yamamoto - bass on "Hairshirt Fracture"

References

2000 EPs
Jim Carroll albums
Kill Rock Stars EPs